Diego Iván Rubio Köstner (born 15 May 1993) is a Chilean footballer who plays as a striker for Major League Soccer club Colorado Rapids.

Club career

Early career
Rubio began his football career with Universidad Católica. However, when he was 14, he took the decision to move to his favorite team Colo-Colo. After one year in the bench with Colo-Colo, in the next season Diego was consecrated in the youth team. After many seasons in the youth ranks, he was promoted to the first professional team in January 2011.

Colo-Colo
Rubio made his professional debut for Colo-Colo in a pre-season friendly against Deportes La Serena as a starter. In other pre-season game, Diego scored his first unofficial goals for the club, in a 3–1 win against Unión Española, in where he scored two goals for his team, being named the man of the match.

His Chilean Primera División came on 14 February 2011 against Unión San Felipe, as an 84th-minute substitution in a 2–0 away defeat. In a Copa Libertadores game played against Santos in Brazil, he scored his first professional goal, but the match finished in a 3–2 loss. On 19 April, Rubio scored his first two goals in the Primera División against La Serena, at 30th and 62nd minute, being named the man of match, in a 4–1 home win. He finally was consecrated in the club in an international game for the Libertadores against Táchira, Rubio gave the 2–1 victory to the club, scoring the two goals of Colo-Colo, after an early goal of Edgar Pérez Greco at 4th minute. After his club's performances, was rumored that Udinese are interested in Rubio.

He played his first derby game against his former youth club Universidad Católica, participating in the equalizer goal of Colo-Colo giving an assistance to Ezequiel Miralles at 81st minute, putting the 1–1 draw. The coach Américo Gallego nominated to Rubio for play the major derby of the Chilean football against Universidad de Chile, however, he only playing 30 minutes in a 2–1 loss.

Sporting CP
On 5 July 2011, Rubio joined Portuguese club Sporting Clube de Portugal for €1.5 million, signing a five-year contract with a €30 million minimum fee release clause.

Loan to Pandurii
On 2 September 2013, Romanian Liga I club Pandurii Târgu Jiu confirmed Rubio was signed on a loan from Sporting, with an option to buy. He debuted in Liga I in the match against Dinamo Bucharest, won by Pandurii 2–1.

Loan to Sandnes Ulf
On 3 February 2014, Rubio joined Tippeligaen side Sandnes Ulf on a season-long loan.

Valladolid
On 31 August 2015, aged 22, signed a four-year contract with Spanish club Real Valladolid.

Sporting Kansas City
On 8 March 2016, Rubio signed a season-long loan with Major League Soccer side Sporting Kansas City as a Designated Player.

He signed with the club on a permanent deal on 1 September 2016.

Colorado Rapids
Ahead of the 2019 season, Rubio was traded to Colorado Rapids in exchange for Kelyn Rowe, $200,000 of General Allocation Money and $100,000 of Target Allocation Money. On Feb. 20, 2019, Rubio signed a three-year contract extension through the 2022 season. Rubio enjoyed a career year with Colorado in 2019. He was the club's second leading scorer with 11 goals in 25 starts among 26 appearances—all MLS career highs.

In 2020, Rubio appeared in 17 matches, starting 13, in the regular season and playoffs. Rubio scored three goals, including game-winning goals on Sept. 12 against Real Salt Lake and Nov. 8 at Houston Dynamo. He also added four assists, including game-winning assists on Opening Day against D.C. United and on Nov. 4 to clinch a playoff berth at Portland Timbers. Rubio was named to the MLS Team of the Week in Weeks 11 and 24.

International career
On 31 May 2011, Rubio was called up by Chile national team manager Claudio Borghi to take part in the 28-man pre-list preparatory process for the upcoming 2011 Copa America. He officially debuted with Chile national team on 23 June 2011, in a match against Paraguay, the last match of Chile before the Copa América.

Rubio returned to the national team and appeared in a 0-0 friendly draw against South Korea on Sept. 11, 2018. Rubio was a substitute in a 1-1 friendly draw against the United States on March 26, 2019. Rubio picked up an assist on Alfonso Parat's goal in a 2-1 friendly loss to Honduras on Sept. 10, 2019, Rubio's first 90-minute performance on the senior international stage. On Nov. 6, 2020, Rubio was called up for Chile's 2022 FIFA World Cup Qualifiers against Peru and Venezuela, but was later released from the squad out of precautions over COVID-19.

Personal life
Diego is the grandson of Ildefonso Rubio, a historical goalkeeper of Rangers de Talca, and the son of Hugo Rubio. Currently working at the Passball company as a football agent, Hugo was a successful football player, having spent most of his extensive career in his country with a short spell in European football, specifically in Italy and Switzerland. Hugo also was a member of the Chile squad at the Copa América of 1987 and 1991. Diego has two footballer brothers, Eduardo, who was a Chile international at senior level, and Matías, who was a Chile international at under-20 level. Diego Rubio is also godchild of the Chilean football legend Iván Zamorano.

On 15 May 2011, was reported that Rubio was on a list of most popular Chilean players on Twitter with 1,247 fans, in the 12th place of 14 players. The list was led by Jorge Valdivia, in the 1st place with more of 50,000 fans.

On 24 May 2013, Diego got married with Rocío Navarro in Seville and on 6 June 2014 his first son Thiago was born.

Rubio earned his U.S. green card in September 2017. This status also qualifies him as a domestic player for MLS roster purposes.

Career statistics

Club

International

Honors

Club
Sporting Kansas City
US Open Cup: Winner 2017

References

External links

Diego Rubio at Football-Lineups

Living people
1993 births
Chilean people of German descent
Chilean footballers
Footballers from Santiago
Association football forwards
Colo-Colo footballers
Sporting CP footballers
Sporting CP B players
CS Pandurii Târgu Jiu players
Sandnes Ulf players
Real Valladolid players
Sporting Kansas City players
Sporting Kansas City II players
Colorado Rapids players
Colorado Rapids 2 players
Chilean Primera División players
Primeira Liga players
Liga Portugal 2 players
Liga I players
Eliteserien players
Segunda División players
Major League Soccer players
USL Championship players
MLS Next Pro players
Chile under-20 international footballers
Chile international footballers
Designated Players (MLS)
Chilean expatriate footballers
Expatriate footballers in Portugal
Chilean expatriate sportspeople in Portugal
Expatriate footballers in Romania
Chilean expatriate sportspeople in Romania
Expatriate footballers in Norway
Chilean expatriate sportspeople in Norway
Expatriate footballers in Spain
Chilean expatriate sportspeople in Spain
Expatriate soccer players in the United States
Chilean expatriate sportspeople in the United States